Tragic Ballad (Italian: Ballata tragica) is a 1954 Italian crime musical melodrama film directed by Luigi Capuano and starring Teddy Reno, Beniamino Maggio and Nando Bruno.

The film's sets were designed by the art director Alfredo Montori.

Cast
 Teddy Reno as Stefano Accardi 
 Beniamino Maggio as Giovanni Barone 
 Nando Bruno as Commisario 
 Marisa Allasio as Maria Rota 
 Tina Pica as Moglie del nostromo 
 Barbara Shelley as Betty Mason 
 Leda Gloria as Signora Barone 
 Marc Lawrence as Felipe Alvaro 
 Enzo Petito as Nostromo 
 Amedeo Girardi as Paolo Accardi 
 Giulio Calì as Marinaio genovese 
 Rosalia Maggio as cameriera casa Accardi 
 Giacomo Furia as Vigile urbano 
 Michele Malaspina as armatore amico Accardi 
 Cesare Fantoni as Ispettore polizia 
 Pasquale De Filippo as Aiutante commissario 
 Natale Cirino as Cesare Rota 
 Mario Passante as Joe 
 Vincent Barbi as complice di Felipe

References

Bibliography 
 Chiti, Roberto & Poppi, Roberto. Dizionario del cinema italiano: Dal 1945 al 1959. Gremese Editore, 1991.

External links 
 

1954 films
Italian crime drama films
1954 drama films
1950s Italian-language films
Films directed by Luigi Capuano
1954 crime drama films
1950s musical drama films
Italian musical drama films
Italian black-and-white films
Melodrama films
1950s Italian films